was a district located in Niigata Prefecture, Japan.

As of 2003, the district had an estimated population of 2,035 and a density of 51.09 persons per km2. The total area is 39.83 km2.

Towns and villages
Prior to its dissolution, the district contained of only one village:

 Yamakoshi

History

Recent mergers
 On April 1, 2005 - The village of Yamakoshi, along with the town of Oguni (from Kariwa District), the town of Nakanoshima (from Minamikanbara District), and the towns of Koshiji and Mishima (both from Santō District), was merged into the expanded city of Nagaoka. Koshi District was dissolved as a result of this merger.

See also
 List of dissolved districts of Japan

Former districts of Niigata Prefecture